Ebenthal in Kärnten is a town in the district of Klagenfurt-Land in the Austrian state of Carinthia.

Geography
Ebenthal lies southeast of Klagenfurt. The Sattnitz Mountains stretch east and west and are a popular goal for outings. The Glan and the Gurk flow through the municipality and into the nearby Wörther Lake. The Glanfurt flows into the Glan near the middle of the municipality. The Radsberg forms the southern boundary of the municipality.

The nature reserve Höflein-Moor is in the municipality.

Population
According to the 2001 census 4.2% of the population are Carinthian Slovenes.

References

Cities and towns in Klagenfurt-Land District